Six ships of the Royal Navy have borne the name HMS Whiting, after the common name for Merlangius merlangus, a species of fish:

  was a 6-gun vessel captured in 1711 and sold in 1712. 
  was a 4-gun  launched in 1805 that the French privateer Diligent captured in 1812.
  was a 12-gun schooner, previously . She was captured in 1812 and wrecked in 1816.
  was an  wooden screw gunboat launched in 1856 and broken up in 1881.
  was a  launched in 1889, renamed HMS Boomerang in 1890 and sold in 1905.

Royal Navy ship names